Suemus is a genus of running crab spiders that was first described by Eugène Louis Simon in 1895.

Species
 it contains five species, found only in Africa and Vietnam:
Suemus atomarius Simon, 1895 (type) – Sierra Leone
Suemus orientalis Simon, 1909 – Vietnam
Suemus punctatus Lawrence, 1938 – South Africa
Suemus tibelliformis Simon, 1909 – Vietnam
Suemus tibelloides Caporiacco, 1947 – East Africa

See also
 List of Philodromidae species

References

Araneomorphae genera
Philodromidae
Spiders of Africa
Spiders of Asia